The 760s decade ran from January 1, 760, to December 31, 769.

References